The 2008 Torneo Descentralizado (known as the Copa Cable Mágico for sponsorship reasons) was the ninety-second season of Peruvian football. A total of 14 teams competed in the tournament, with Universidad San Martín defending their national title. The season began on February 17, 2008 and ended on December 14, 2008.

Competition modus
The season was divided into two tournaments; Torneo Apertura from February to July and the Torneo Clausura from July to December. Both tournaments had the fourteen teams play a round-robin home-and-away round for a total of 26 matches in each tournament. The winner of the Torneo Apertura qualified to the 2009 Copa Libertadores group stage and was eligible to play in the season final if they finished above 8th place in the Torneo Clausura. The winner of the Torneo Clausura also qualified to the group stage and was eligible to play in the season final if they finished above 8th place in the Torneo Apertura. A team that would've won both tournament was automatically season champion. If one of the tournament winners failed to place above 8th place, the other tournament winner would've been season champion. If both teams failed to finish above 8th place, the team that placed higher on the aggregate table–the summation of the points earned in both tournaments–would've been season champion. The two teams that placed last on the aggregate table were relegated and the best placed team–excluding the two tournament winners–qualified to the first stage of the 2009 Copa Libertadores. The second and third best placed teams on the aggregate table qualified to the 2009 Copa Sudamericana.

Changes from 2007

Structural changes
The number of teams was increased from 12 to 14.
Due to the increase in teams, the tournament winners could finish in the top seven instead of the top six to play in the season finals.
1,170 minutes of game time was to be accumulated by players born on or after 1989 in the Torneo Apertura and Torneo Clausura. The amount for the Torneo Clausura was later reduced to 600.
The minimum stadium capacity was increased from 4,000 to 5,000.

Promotion and relegation
Deportivo Municipal and Total Clean finished the 2007 season in 11th and 12th place, respectively, in the aggregate table and thus were relegated to the Segunda División. They were replaced by the champions of the Segunda División 2007 and Copa Perú 2007, Universidad César Vallejo and Juan Aurich. The F.P.F. also invited José Gálvez and Minero into the first division.

Season overview
Universitario won the Apertura title after 6 years of failing to win a half-year tournament. They won the title with 50 points, a ten-point lead, and had four games left to be played. Sporting Cristal was the other team close to winning the title, however they had three games left to play and would have been unable to reach Universitario. Universitario had a 15-game undefeated streak and a 9-game winning streak. In the Clausura Universitario did surprisingly worse and finished 11th. They lost four games at home and failed to finish in the top 7 to contest the national title. U. San Martin finished third in the Apertura and won the Clausura with three games to spare. They achieved their second national title after only four years of existence. This is the first time since 1958 where the big three were not able to win the title for two consecutive years.

Alianza Lima experienced a terrible season because they were close to being relegated this season. Every team, with the exception of José Gálvez, gained points playing at their home ground and they had also lost several home games. Fortunately, Alianza Lima remained in the First Division. Sport Boys saved itself from relegation two years ago, however this year they could not. They were the worst team of the year and won very few games. Problems arose in the club as the players were not paid for many months. This led to a sorrowful year for the fans of Sport Boys.

Teams

Torneo Apertura

Standings

Results

Top goalscorers
20 goals
 Miguel Ximénez (Sporting Cristal)
13 goals
 Juan Gonzáles-Vigil (Bolognesi)
12 goals
 Jamie Ruiz (Alianza Atlético)
 Héctor Hurtado (Universitario)
11 goals
 Wilmer Aguirre (Alianza Lima)
 Gustavo Vassallo (Cienciano)
 Germán Carty (Sport Áncash)
9 goals
 Donny Neyra (Universitario)
 Carlos Lobaton (Sporting Cristal)
 Pedro García (U. San Martín)
 Carlos Alberto Pérez (Sport Boys)

Torneo Clausura

Standings

Results

Top goalscorers
15 goals
 Ronaille Calheira (Sport Áncash)
14 goals
 Claudio Velásquez (José Gálvez)
12 goals
Miguel Ximénez (Sporting Cristal)
11 goals
 José Luis Díaz (Universidad San Martín)
 Sergio Ibarra (Melgar)
10 goals
 Antonio Meza Cuadra (José Gálvez)
9 goals
 Roberto Jiménez (Universitario)
8 goals
 Juan Barros (Coronel Bolognesi)
 Mauricio Montes (Cienciano)
7 goals
 Donny Neyra (Universitario)
 Piero Alva (Cienciano)
 Wilmer Aguirre (Alianza Lima)
 Roberto Ovelar (U. San Martín)

Aggregate table

12th/13th place playoff

Atlético Minero relegated to Segunda División.

References

External links
Peru 2008 season at RSSSF
Peruvian Football League News 

Peruvian Primera División seasons
1